Ambatovola (also known as Ambatovola Gara) is a rural municipality in Madagascar. It belongs to the district of Moramanga, which is a part of Alaotra-Mangoro Region. The population of the commune was 7,339 in a 2018.

The town provides a primary and junior level of education, and 99% of the population of the commune are farmers.  

Rice, bananas, coffee and ginger are some of the town's most important crops.  Services provide employment for 1% of the population.

Nature
A part of the Andasibe-Mantadia National Park is situated in this municipality.  It is situated at the Sanatanora river.

References

Populated places in Alaotra-Mangoro